The Western Block of the North China Craton is an ancient micro-continental block mainly composed of Neoarchean and Paleoproterozoic rock basement, with some parts overlain by Cambrian to Cenozoic volcanic and sedimentary rocks. It is one of two sub-blocks (the Eastern Block and the Western Block) within the North China Craton, located in east-central China. The boundaries of the Western Block are slightly different among distinct models, but the shapes and areas are similar. There is a broad consensus that the Western Block covers a large part of the east-central China.

Igneous, sedimentary and metamorphic rocks are present in the Western Block. The oldest geological records in the Western Block are 2.7 billion-year-old intrusive igneous rock found in Xiwulanbulang in Inner Mongolia. The youngest rocks are 23-million-year-old extrusive igneous rocks, which are located in Sanyitang (in Hebei) in the orogenic belt across the block. The sedimentary rocks distribute predominantly in the Ordos Basin located in the south of the Western Block. Exposures of metamorphic rocks are mostly scattered in the north of the block.

The tectonic setting and evolution of the Western Block are debated. There are various models hypothesizing the subdivisions and tectonic history of the block and they are generally mutually exclusive. However, most models agree with the presence of a Paleoproterozoic orogenic belt cutting across the Western Block in the east-west direction, despite having various names for it.

Since the geological events of the Western Block started in Precambrian time, when more than 80% of the present volume of continental crust formed, complex geological evolution and early tectonic history can be studied through the geological records in the Western Block.

Lithologies

Precambrian basement (4600–539 million years ago)

Archean rocks (4.0–2.5 billion years ago) 
The earliest geological units found in the Western Block are formed in Neoarchean , when the major crustal accretion and reworking took place. The Neoarchean rocks in the Precambrian basement are mainly composed of greenstones, high-grade metamorphic rocks and granitoids. Mineral examinations show an isobaric cooling-type anticlockwise pressure-temperature (P-T) path, indicating there were intrusions and underplating events during the crustal growth in Neoarchean.

Guyang granite–greenstone terrane 

The Guyang granite-greenstone terrane is located in the northern part of the Western Block, spreading from Mount Serteng to Donghongsheng in the east-west direction. The terrane is dominated by metamorphic and granitoid rocks. It is suggested that the terrane may represent ancient metamorphism in the upper crust.

Greenstones are sequences of Precambrian metamorphosed ultramafic to mafic rocks and sedimentary rocks. They are well exposed in Mount Serteng in Guyang granite-greenstone terrane. There are three sub-units in the greenstone sequence in this terrane. The lower layer is dominated by metamorphosed mafic and ultramafic volcanic rocks, with interlayered banded iron formation. The middle rock assemblage consists of a series of metamorphosed volcanic rocks with compositions varying from acidic to mafic. The top layer is made by meta-sedimentary rocks, for example quartzite and marble. According to the data of zircon dating, the bottom layer of the greenstone sequence formed in about 2.54 billion years ago, while the middle and upper layers have the age later than 2.51 billion years.

Granitoids are intrusive igneous rocks that primarily made by quartz, feldspars and micas. The granitoid rocks found in Guyang granite-greenstone terrane are mostly tonalite-trondhjemite-granodiorite (TTG) and sanukitoid. There were two phases forming TTGs, with the first stage at about 2.53 billion years ago and the second one at between 2.52-2.48 billion years ago. The sanukitoid in this terrane formed between the two phases of TTG formation, at about 2.53-2.52 billion years ago.

Wuchuan high-grade complex
Wuchuan high-grade complex extends from Zhulagou in the west to Xiwulanbulang in the east. The complex includes granitoids, granulites and charnockite. The granitoid rocks are predominantly medium (550-650 °C)- to high-grade (650-900 °C) metamorphosed diorite and the granulites are high-grade metamorphosed TTG rocks. Similar to Guyang granite-greenstone terrane, the rocks in Wuchuan have the age of 2.55-2.50 billion years. The high-grade complex is interpreted to be the metamorphosed lower crust in 2.55-2.50 billion years ago.

Proterozoic rocks (2500–539 million years ago) 
Many researchers proposed that the Western Block of the North China Craton was assembled in the Paleoproterozoic (2.5-1.6 billion years ago), creating a linear structure composed of khondalite that cuts across the Western Block. The khondalite belt stretches from Helanshan in the west to Jining Complex in the east. Pelitic granulites, quartzite, felsic paragneiss and marble, which are the members of the "khondalite series", are exposed along this belt. The khondalite series is metamorphosed from sedimentary protoliths formed under stable continental margin condition. By zircon dating, the sedimentary protoliths were deposited at 2.3-2.0 billion years ago and then experienced metamorphism at 1.95-1.87 billion years ago. The minerals in the khondalite exhibit isothermal decompression-type clockwise P-T paths, implying the sedimentary protoliths were metamorphosed in a collisional setting.

Phanerozoic stratigraphy (539 million year ago–present) 
The Western Block became much more stable after Precambrian. Sedimentary rocks were deposited, covering part of the Precambrian basement. There were also magmatism in Phanerozoic.During Cambrian to Middle Ordovician, extensive carbonates were formed in the Western Block. Deposits were generally absent from Late Ordovician to Early Carboniferous. However, carbonates with some coal-bearing rocks started to deposit again between Late Carboniferous and Early Permian. In Late Permian, conglomerates as well as red iron-bearing sandstone, siltstone and mudstone (red beds) were formed. In Triassic and Jurassic, the stratigraphy was dominated by sandstone and mudstone. Sandstone deposition, together with magmatism happened in the Early Cretaceous, forming extrusive igneous rocks in the Western Block, for example rhyolite, andesite, basalt and dacite. From Late Cretaceous onwards, igneous rocks became minor. Late Cretaceous to Cenozoic sediments with Cenozoic basalt overlay the pre-existing strata.

Tectonic subdivision 
The tectonic subdivision of the Western Block is still under intense discussion among geologists. There are several models illustrating the tectonic subdivision of the Western Block and these models assign different names to the components and structures of the Western Blocks. The shapes and areas of Western Block in these models are similar but they may not completely concordant with each other.

Zhao and his colleagues proposed that the Western Block of the North China Craton can be subdivided into two sub-blocks: Yinshan Block and Ordos Block. In between the sub-blocks is a Paleoproterozoic continent–continent collisional belt defined as Khondalite Belt. The Khondalite Belt extends across the whole block in east-northeast (ENE) and west-southwest (WSW) direction. Kusky and his co-workers  divided the Western Block into three elements, including the Inner Mongolia-Northern Hebei Orogen, Hengshan Plateau and a micro-continental block. The southern boundary of the Hengshan Plateau is marked by the normal faults, which have a general trend of east-northeast (ENE) and west-southwest (WSW) direction. There is a northeast-southwest trending fault called Datong-Wuqi Fault, cutting across the Western Block. Similar to Zhao et al.'s model, Santosh split the Western Block into Yinshan Block and Ordos Block in the north and south respectively. However, instead of Khondalite Belt, he named the collision region of the two sub-blocks Inner Mongolia Suture Zone. Discontinuous Khondalite Belt exposures lie inside south of the Inner Mongolia Suture Zone.

Tectonic evolution

Precambrian history 
There are various evolutionary models of the Western Block proposed by different geologists. Three most popular models explaining the tectonic evolution of the Precambrian basement are discussed below.

Zhao et al's model 
Zhao et al.'s model can be divided into two major stages: Neoarchean crustal accretion and Paleoproterozoic amalgamation of the two sub-blocks (Yinshan Block and Orods Block). Zhao and other researchers proposed that there was a major crustal accretion of the juvenile Yinshan Block at about 2.7 billion years ago, forming a thick mafic crust, although it is still uncertain whether the magmatic event occurred in a continental or an oceanic setting. During 2.55-2.50 billion years ago, the juvenile Yinshan Block was partially melted to produce enormous amounts of TTG rocks, covering the whole Yinshan Block. At about 2.45 billion years ago, Ordos Block was subducted beneath the Yinshan Block. The partial melting of the subducting slab formed granites and volcanic rocks like adakites and sanukitoids. Between 2.0-1.95 billion year ago, sedimentary rocks deposited on the stable passive margins of continent in the northern Ordos Block. The final assembly of the Western Block took place at approximately 1.95 billion years ago. The ancient ocean closed as the continents of southern Yinshan Block and northern Ordos Block collided. The high pressure and temperature of continent-continent collision formed Khondalite Belt in-between the two sub-blocks and led to metamorphism in other parts of the Western Block.

Kusky et al's model 
In Kusky et al.'s model, ancient continental blocks formed the juvenile Western Block during 3.5-2.7 billion years ago. Prior to 2.3 billion years ago, Wutai Arc was subducted under the eastern part of the juvenile Western Block, while an exotic arc was subducted under the eastern juvenile Western Block. Between 2.3-2.0 billion year ago, the Western Block collided with the two arc on its both sides, creating Hengshan granulite belt in the southeast and Inner Mongolia-Northern Hebei Orogen with khondalite belt inside in the northwest. Finally, supercontinent Columbia collided in the northern margin of the North China Craton at 1.8 billion years ago.

Santosh's model 
Unlike the Zhao's and Kusky's models, the tectonic evolution of the Western Block suggested by Santosh primarily focused on the amalgamation of the Western Block, with fewer discussion on the early tectonic development before collisional events. Santosh considered the Ordos Block as a continental arc composed by TTGs and charnockites. Supported by zircon dating and tomographic data, Santosh proposed that the Yinshan Block and Ordos Block collided at around 1.92 billion years ago, with Yinshan Block subducted under Ordos Block. An accretionary wedge was formed when the two sub-blocks collided. Part of the basaltic oceanic crust was incorporated into the accretionary wedge. Santosh named the accretionary wedge region as Inner Mongolia Suture Zone. Khondalite belt was also formed in the suture zone.

Phanerozoic history 
The Western Block became tectonically stable after the amalgamation in Precambrian. Sediment deposition and volcanic activities began to form rocks covering the Precambrian basement. Except a gap of geological record during Late Ordovician to Early Carboniferous, from Cambrian to Jurassic, various types of sedimentary rock formed a thick strata.

In Early Cretaceous, extensive magmatic activities developed in the eastern part of the Western Block due to cratonic destruction. At that time, a large portion of the North China Craton was eliminated and unstable. The cratonic destruction was induced by the subduction of the Pacific Plate beneath the Asian continent, followed by crust thickening and hence gravitational collapse of the crust. The craton was thus in extension. The processes led to the thinning of crust, deformation and magmatic events over the North China Craton. Although most of the magmatic activities happened in the Eastern Block, volcanic eruption also took place in the eastern part of the Western Block to produce volcanic rocks like basalt, andesite, dacite and rhyolite. During Cenozoic, because of the thin crust, lava erupted to the surface and the volcanic events produced basalts.

See also 

 North China Craton
 Eastern Block of North China Craton
 Geology of China
 Khondalite
 Greenstone Belt
 Archean subduction

Notes 
a.Ga refers to billion years ago; Ma refers to million years ago.

References 



Cratons
Northeast China
Geology of China
Historical tectonic plates
Historical continents